Mohamed Ben Slimane (born 29 November 1981) is a Tunisian volleyball player. He competed in the men's tournament at the 2012 Summer Olympics.

References

1981 births
Living people
Tunisian men's volleyball players
Olympic volleyball players of Tunisia
Volleyball players at the 2012 Summer Olympics
Sportspeople from Tunis